Kenya Electricity Generating Company PLC  abbreviated to KenGen, is a government enterprise in the Republic of Kenya charged with the production of electricity for the country. KenGen is the largest electric power producer in Kenya, generating over 60% of the electricity consumed in the country.

Overview 
KenGen relies on various sources to generate electricity, ranging from hydropower, geothermal, thermal and wind, with hydropower being the leading source of electricity.

The company owns 30 hydropower plants with a combined capacity of 825.69 MW, four thermal power plants generating 256 MW, seven geothermal power plants with a generating capacity of 713.13 MW and one Wind power plant at Ngong producing 26 MW, for a combined generating capacity of 1,817.82 MW.

Presently KenGen operates five major geothermal power plants with 12 installed units, namely: Olkaria I, Olkaria II, Olkaria I unit 4 and 5, Olkaria IV, Olkaria V. 16 wellhead plants with 21 installed units.

The Olkaria geothermal power stations are located in Nakuru County within the Hell's Gate National Park bordering Lake Naivasha within the Great Rift Valley.

History 

The company was founded on 1 February 1954 as the Kenya Power Company (KPC) and was commissioned to construct the transmission line between Nairobi and Tororo in Uganda. This was to transmit power generated at the Owen Falls Dam to Kenya. KPC was also tasked to develop electricity generating facilities in the country.

KPC was managed by the Kenya Power and Lighting Company under a management contract. In January 1997, the management of KPC was formally separated from Kenya Power as a direct result of reforms being undertaken in the energy sector and the entire economy. Subsequently, on 19 January 1998 the company changed its name from Kenya Power Company to Kenya Electricity Generating Company. The trading name KenGen PLC was also adopted at this point.

In 2006, KenGen was listed on the Nairobi Securities Exchange after the Government of Kenya sold 30 percent of its stake in the company through a successful initial public offering that received over 280,000 applications.

Ownership
KenGen currently has 6,594,522,339 shares. The stock of Kenya Electricity Generating Company is listed on the NSE, where it trades under the symbol: KEGN

List of power stations and installed capacity 
See also List of power stations in Kenya

Current capacity
The current capacity of KenGen's power stations are;

Hydroelectric
Gitaru Hydro Power Plant – 225 MW
Gogo Hydro Power Plant – 2 MW, on the Gucha River
Kamburu Hydro Power Plant – 93 
Kiambere Hydro Power Plant – 169 MW
Kindaruma Hydroelectric Power Station – 72 MW
Masinga Hydroelectric Power Station – 40 MW
Mesco Hydro Power Plant – 0.43 MW
Sagana Hydro Power Plant – 1.5 MW
Sondu Miriu Hydroelectric Power Station – 60 MW
Sosiani Hydro Power Plant – 0.4 MW
Tana Hydroelectric Power Station – 20 MW
Turkwel Hydro Power Plant – 106 MW
Wanjii Hydroelectric Power Station – 7.4 MW

Geothermal
Olkaria I Geothermal Power Plant - 45 MW
Olkaria II Geothermal Power Plant - 105 MW 
Olkaria I AU Geothermal Power Station - 140 MW
Olkaria V Geothermal Plant- 172MW
Eburru Geothermal Power Plant – 2.44 MW
 Wellhead Geothermal Power Plant (Olkaria)- 5.0 MW
 Wellhead Generation – 81 MW

Thermal
Kipevu I Diesel – 60 MW
Kipevu III Diesel – 115 MW
Muhoroni Gas Turbine - 55 MW

Wind
 Ngong Hills Wind Power Station: Phase I – 5.1 MW
 Ngong Hills Wind Power Station: Phase II – 20.4 MW

Future projects
KenGen plans to increase it installed capacity to 721 megawatts by 2025.

Geothermal

 Olkaria I Unit 6  – 70 MW  – Completion Year:  2022 
 Eburru Project – 25 MW  – Completion Year: 2016
 Olkaria VI – 140 MW  – Completion Year: 2016/17
 Olkaria VII – 140 MW  – Completion Year: 2018
 Olkaria VIII – 140 MW  – Completion Year: 2018

Wind

 Wind Power Station: Phase II – 300  MW – Completion Year: 2020

Lists 
 List of countries by electricity exports
 List of countries by electricity imports
 List of countries by electricity production

References

External links 

Electric power companies of Kenya
Government-owned companies of Kenya
Energy companies established in 1954
Renewable resource companies established in 1954
1954 establishments in Kenya
Companies listed on the Nairobi Securities Exchange